David Wallace is a former football (soccer) player who represented New Zealand at international level.

Wallace made his full All Whites debut in a 4–1 win over New Caledonia on 4 June 1962 and ended his international playing career with five A-international caps to his credit, his final cap an appearance in a 1–3 loss to New Caledonia on 8 October 1968.

References 

Year of birth missing (living people)
Living people
New Zealand association footballers
New Zealand international footballers
Association footballers not categorized by position